Gilbert Kahele (May 15, 1942 – January 26, 2016) was an American politician and a Democratic member of the Hawaii Senate from January 16, 2011, representing District 1. He was appointed by Governor Neil Abercrombie to fill the vacancy caused by the appointment of Russell S. Kokubun as Hawaii Commissioner of Agriculture. Kahele died in office on January 26, 2016, after being hospitalized one week prior.

Early life and education 

The son of Peter and Rebecca Kahele, both of Hawaiian descent, Gilbert was the third of six children. Kahele was born in a grass shack in Kalihi, just south of the Hawaiian fishing village of Miloliʻi in South Kona.

Kahele attended Hilo High School, played on the Vikings football team, and graduated in 1960. Kahele served in the United States Marine Corps for four years in the engineering troop responsible for refrigeration. After the military, Kahele graduated with an Associate degree in Science in 1967 from Oakland City College in Oakland, California.

Career 
Kahele moved back to Hawaiʻi where he began a civil service career that would last 33 years. He got a job with the Federal Government at Naval Station Wahiawa as a refrigeration mechanic. For the next 25 years, Gil drove from Hilo on Saddle Road to his job at the Pohakuloa Training Area, from which he retired in 2000 as the Director of Public Works.

Governor Neil Abercrombie selected Kahele to represent Senate District Two on Hawaiʻi Island after Senator Russell S. Kokubun resigned his seat to take a position in Abercrombie's cabinet in January 2011. Kahele was unopposed for both the August 11, 2012 Democratic primary and the November 6, 2012 general election.

Personal life 
He married United Airlines stewardess Linda Haggberg in October 1971, and the couple lived in Wahiawa. In 1976, the couple moved to Hilo. They had two children, Kai and Noelani.

Kahele died early on January 26, 2016, after a short illness which caused him to miss the 2016 Hawaii State Legislature's opening day. His son, Kai, won the special election to succeed him.

References

External links
Official page at the Hawaii State Legislature
Campaign site
 

1942 births
2016 deaths
Democratic Party Hawaii state senators
People from Hawaii (island)
People from Hilo, Hawaii
Military personnel from Hawaii
United States Marines
Native Hawaiian people
Laney College